Ždánice is a town in Hodonín District in the South Moravian Region of the Czech Republic. It has about 2,500 inhabitants.

Geography
It lies in the Ždánice Forest, which is named after the town. A small southern part on the municipal territory lies in the Kyjov Hills. A small river called Trkmanka flows through the town.

History
The first written mention of Ždánice is from 1349.

References

External links

Populated places in Hodonín District
Cities and towns in the Czech Republic
Moravian Slovakia